Bhiri Shah Rahman  is a village in Punjab, Pakistan, 40 km west of Gujranwala. The tomb of Shah Abdul Rahman (death 1115 A.H) (Darbar Shah Rahman), built about 1700, is located in the village. The name of the village (Bhiri Shah Rahman) is associated with this sacred name due to his tomb.

Generally, Bhiri Shah Rahman includes two towns merged i.e. Bhiri Kalan ( upper Bhiri) and Bhiri Khurd (Lower Bhiri) associated as Bhiri Shah Rahman. It is the last rural area on the boundary of district Gujranwala connected with district Hafizabad.

Schools located;

Govt. High School Bhiri Khurd (Gujranwala)

Govt. Girls High School Bhiri Shah Rehman (Gujranwala)

Sanabil Educare International Bhiri Shah Rahman (Gujranwala)

References

Tayyab Haneef Advocate, resident of village Bhiri Shah Rahman, Gujranwala

Villages in Gujranwala District